The Little Harquahala Mountains are a small, arid, low-elevation mountain range of western-central Arizona, in the southeast of La Paz County.

The range is northwest-by-southeast-trending and is in a region of about thirty landforms, plains, valleys, and mountain ranges called the Maria fold and thrust belt. The region is in the Basin and Range and three mountain ranges are in a parallel, northwest-by-southeast-trending thrust belt, with two intervening valleys. The Little Harquahala Range borders the second valley and third mountain range, the McMullen Valley and Harquahala Mountains, on their southwest borders.

The range is a section of a water divide for tributaries to two river watersheds on the Gila and Colorado Rivers. An even smaller range is connected north on the water divide, the 8-mile (13 km) long Granite Wash Mountains.

Maria fold and thrust belt
The three mountain ranges and two valleys bordered to the northeast:
 Buckskin Mountains
 Butler Valley (Arizona)
 Harcuvar Mountains
 McMullen Valley
 Harquahala Mountains

Peaks and landforms

Granite Wash Pass is located at the northwest end of the mountains; Hope is west and Harcuvar, Arizona is east. The pass contains a rail transportation line, as well as U.S. Route 60 in Arizona from Brenda at Interstate 10 in Arizona, and the route northeast to Aguila, then to Wickenburg, on U.S. 93.

Bouse Wash and Centennial Wash
The Little Harquahala Mountains are on the northwest-by-southeast water divide between two washes. The Bouse Wash flows northwest to the Colorado River; Centennial Wash (Maricopa County) is east and flows southeast to meet the Gila River at the "great Gila Bend", adjacent to the Gila Bend Mountains.

See also
 List of Bouse and Centennial Wash landforms

References

External links
 Opuntia basilaris, Beavertail cactus, University of Arizona Herbarium, Little Harquahala Mountains
 Little Harquahala Mountains, mountainzone
 regional trails, trails.com

Drainage divides
Mountain ranges of the Sonoran Desert
Mountain ranges of La Paz County, Arizona
Mountain ranges of Arizona